Neromia propinquilinea is a moth of the family Geometridae first described by Louis Beethoven Prout in 1920. It is found in Sénégal.

It has a wingspan of 27–32 mm. The forewings are bright light green with some scattered metallic-blue scales and with whitish strigulations (fine streaks). The underside is much paler, unmarked and a whitish blue-green. On both wings there is a very faint and minute reddish cell-dot. This species was described from a specimen from Sédhiou.

References

Moths described in 1920
Geometrinae
Lepidoptera of West Africa
Moths of Africa
Fauna of Senegal